Perry Rubenstein (January 15, 1954 - July 21, 2022) was an American gallerist.

In 2016, he was charged with embezzlement related to the sale of artworks. In 2017, he pled no contest to the charges of embezzlement and agreed to pay restitution. He was sentenced to six months in prison.

References 

1954 births
2022 deaths